Sandro Laurindo da Silva  (born 29 April 1984 in Rio de Janeiro), known as Sandro Silva, is a Brazilian footballer who plays as a midfielder.

Career
On 10 February 2010 Botafogo reduce the time for sign the midfielder of Palmeiras, the player would arrive on loan until May 2011. However, in the summer 2010 he was snapped by Málaga CF for a transfer fee of €2.2 million.

During the next summer, he was loaned back to Brazil. This time to Internacional with an option to buy for €2 million after the season.

Position
He plays as a defensive midfielder, but can play also as a central midfielder or also as a right back.

Honours
Botafogo
Campeonato Carioca: 2010

Internacional
Campeonato Gaúcho: 2012

References

Family
Relation to Mixed Martial Arts Fighter Seyandro Silva

External links

1984 births
Living people
Brazilian footballers
Brazilian expatriate footballers
Association football midfielders
Mirassol Futebol Clube players
Sociedade Esportiva Palmeiras players
Botafogo de Futebol e Regatas players
Sport Club Internacional players
Cruzeiro Esporte Clube players
CR Vasco da Gama players
Clube Atlético Bragantino players
Oeste Futebol Clube players
Associação Portuguesa de Desportos players
Málaga CF players
Campeonato Brasileiro Série A players
La Liga players
Expatriate footballers in Spain
Footballers from Rio de Janeiro (city)